Breccia Peak is a mountain in the southern Absaroka Range of the Rocky Mountains. It is located in Teton County in the U.S. state of Wyoming, close to the southwest border of the Teton Wilderness within the Bridger-Teton National Forest.

Geography 
The plateau-like summit contains the steep and rocky Breccia Cliffs on its west and north faces, while a mainly grassy face exists to the east and south.

Breccia Peak is the most prominent mountain in the immediate area, topping Buffalo Fork Peak to its north by about 200 feet (61 m). Higher peaks can be found along the Teton Range, located more than 30 miles (48 km) to the west.

This is a small but very scenic lake where the Breccia Cliffs reflect off the water during certain times of day.

Geology 
Breccia Peak is made of volcanic Absorka breccia, a form of rock composed of broken fragments of minerals cemented together, and from which the mountain takes its name. The rocks in the section of the summit belonging to the Wiggins Formation originated in the Upper Eocene epoch. The saddle between Breccia Peak and Angle Mountain contains an elongate irregular intrusive body of glassy flow-banded rhyodacite porphyry showing minor wall-rock alteration.

Climbing 
Visitors will encounter a challenging but minimally dangerous path (YDS Class 2, Swiss Alpine Club hiking grade T3). A well-established but unofficial trail leads from the trailhead to the treeline, and early on there is a fork that leads to Breccia Peak (left) or Sublette Peak (right).

To climb, the easiest route involves traversing the southeast face to reach the east ridge, avoiding a steep rocky cliff in the middle. From there, climbers can follow the east ridge to the summit. An alternative is to traverse the southwest face to the south ridge of Breccia Peak, and then follow this ridge to the summit.

The southeast face of the mountain above the treeline is particularly suitable for backcountry skiing. The runs are short but quite varied.

References

External links 

Mountains of Teton County, Wyoming
Mountains of Wyoming
Bridger–Teton National Forest